Efthimios Papadopoulos (born 29 April 1983) is a Greek middle distance runner who specializes in the 800 metres.

He finished ninth at the 2006 IAAF World Cup. He also competed at the 2006 European Championships without reaching the final.

His personal best time is 1:46.56 minutes, achieved in July 2006 in Athens. This ranks him third on the Greek all-time list, only behind Panagiotis Stroubakos and Sotirios Moutsanas.

References 

1983 births
Living people
Greek male middle-distance runners